Örebro SK is the football section of the Swedish sport club of the same name.

Örebro SK may also refer to:

 Örebro SK Bandy, bandy section
 Örebro SK Handboll, handball section
 Örebro SK Ungdom, youth section

See also
Örebro
Örebro Läns Fotbollförbund